Engineers Club or Engineers' Club may refer to the following:
 Engineers Club of Dayton, Dayton, Ohio
 Engineers' Club of Saint Louis, St. Louis, Missouri
 Engineers' Club Building, Manhattan, New York

See also
 Engineers Country Club